is a Japanese yaoi light novel series written by Katsura Izumi and illustrated by Hinako Takanaga. It is licensed in North America by Digital Manga Publishing, which released all 4 books of the series through its yaoi imprint, Juné, between October 21, 2008 and July 8, 2009.

Novels
The first two novels were published by Movic before the title was transferred to Frontier Works. The books were re-released in 2005.

Reception
Melinda Beasi of Pop Culture Shock commends the series for "some nice characterization and real emotional depth" but criticizes it for "uncomfortably humiliating sex scenes or homophobic self-loathing of the series’ protagonist". ActiveAnime's Rachel Bentham describes the series as "torrid and wantonly graphic and at the same time manages to throw in some romantic angles" and praises the "gorgeous artwork".

References

Further reading

2002 Japanese novels
2008 manga
Digital Manga Publishing titles
Josei manga
Yaoi light novels